John Cadusch (14 January 1914 – 25 January 2000) was an  Australian rules footballer who played with Fitzroy in the Victorian Football League (VFL).

Notes

External links 
		

1914 births
2000 deaths
Australian rules footballers from Victoria (Australia)
Fitzroy Football Club players